The 1993–1997  Bolivian National Congress was a meeting of the Bolivian legislature composed of the Chamber of Senators and Chamber of Deputies. It met in La Paz from August 1993 to August 1997 during the presidency of Gonzalo Sánchez de Lozada.

The Congress was elected as part of the general elections on 6 June 1993.

Congressional presidential ballot 
As no candidate reached the required popular vote majority, the newly elected Congress elected the president on 6 August.

Gonzalo Sánchez de Lozada of the Revolutionary Nationalist Movement (MNR) was the only candidate voted on and was elected with the support of Solidarity Civic Unity (UCS) and the Free Bolivia Movement (MBL). All other parties abstained.

Leadership

National Congress 
 President: Víctor Hugo Cárdenas (MRTKL), from 6 August 1993

Chamber of Senators 
 President: Juan Carlos Durán (MNR), until August 1996
 Raúl Lema Patiño (MNR), from August 1996

Chamber of Deputies 
 President: Guillermo Bedregal Gutiérrez (MNR), until August 1994
Javier Campero Paz (MNR), until August 1995
Guillermo Bedregal Gutiérrez (MNR), until August 1996
Jorge Felix Prestel Kern (MNR), from August 1996

Composition

Chamber of Senators 
1993–1997 members of the Chamber of Senators:

Chamber of Deputies 
1993–1997 members of the Chamber of Deputies:

Notes

References 

Members of the Plurinational Legislative Assembly
Political history of Bolivia